Aerocoach (full name General American Aerocoach Corporation) was a bus and coach manufacturer based in Chicago, Illinois, in the United States and was popular in the 1940s. The company existed between 1939 and 1952 when it went out of business. Its first manager was Harry Alphonse Fitzjohn, co-founder of the FitzJohn-Erwin Manufacturing Company.

Demise and Fate of East Chicago Plant
The East Chicago plant was acquired by Steel Car Company, a subsidiary of the General American Transportation Corporation, then by Graver Tank and Manufacturing Company and finally by Union Tank Car Company in 1969 to manufacture railway tank cars until it closed in 2008.

Products
 P45-37
 P46-37
 P46-137
 P-373 - 37 passenger intercity coach
 P-372 - intercity coach

See also
 FitzJohn Coach Company

References 

Defunct bus manufacturers of the United States
Companies that have filed for bankruptcy in the United States
Vehicle manufacturing companies established in 1939
Vehicle manufacturing companies disestablished in 1952
1939 establishments in Illinois
1952 disestablishments in Indiana